Desley Simpson is a New Zealand politician who is an Auckland councillor. In October 2022, Simpson was chosen as the deputy mayor of Auckland.

Early life

Simpson attended Diocesan School for Girls, Auckland, where she learned to play the organ. She is still an organist. Simpson's grandfather Sir James Donald was also a politician in Auckland and she paid tribute to him in her maiden speech and wore the fob chain presented to him when he became deputy chairman of the Auckland Harbour Board in 1935.

Political career

Simpson is a member of the National Party. She chaired the Hobson Community Board in the Auckland City Council. With the merger of Auckland City Council into the Auckland Council, Simpson was elected to the Ōrākei Local Board at the 2010 elections and became the chairperson. She was re-elected in 2013.

At the 2016 Auckland elections, Simpson stood for the Ōrākei ward on the council, following an announcement by incumbent Cameron Brewer that he would not stand for re-election. Simpson stood for Communities and Residents, despite the formation of Auckland Future, a group supported by the National Party. Simpson was elected to council in a landslide, receiving over 18,000 votes. The Mayor of Auckland, Phil Goff, appointed her as the deputy chair of the finance and performance committee.

Simpson was re-elected in the 2022 Auckland elections, and was chosen by incoming mayor Wayne Brown as the deputy mayor of Auckland.

Personal life

Simpson is married to the National Party president, Peter Goodfellow. She was previously married to National MP, Scott Simpson, and they separated in 2004 or 2005. Since September 2008, she has lived with Goodfellow, who defeated her former husband for the party presidency in 2009.

References

21st-century New Zealand women politicians
Auckland Councillors
Deputy mayors of places in New Zealand
Living people
People educated at Diocesan School for Girls, Auckland
Year of birth missing (living people)